Fergus Lee-Warner (born 3 February 1994, in Australia) is an Australian rugby union player who plays for Bath in English Premiership Rugby competition. His original playing position is lock or flanker. He was named in the Force squad for the Global Rapid Rugby competition in 2020.

On 4 April 2022 it was announced that Fergus had signed for Worcester Warriors on a 3 year contract to play in the Gallagher Premiership starting with the 2022/23 season.

On 5 October 2022 all Worcester players had their contacts terminated due to the liquidation of the company to which they were contracted. However, Lee-Warner had previously signed a loan deal with Bath. In October 2022, it was confirmed that he would remain at Bath until the end of the 2022–23 season.

Reference list

External links
Rugby.com.au profile
itsrugby.co.uk profile

1994 births
Australian rugby union players
Living people
Rugby union locks
Rugby union flankers
Greater Sydney Rams players
Western Force players
Worcester Warriors players
Bath Rugby players
Rugby union players from New South Wales